"Go In, Go Hard" is a song by British musician Angel featuring vocals from English rapper Wretch 32. It was released on 18 March 2012 as the lead single from his debut studio album About Time (2013). The song peaked at number 41 on the UK Singles Chart and number 14 on the UK R&B Chart.

Music video
A music video to accompany the release of "Go In, Go Hard" was first released onto YouTube on 2 February 2012 at a total length of three minutes and forty-eight seconds.

Track listing

Chart performance

Release history

References

Angel (British musician) songs
2012 debut singles
Songs written by James Abrahart
2012 songs
Songs written by Wretch 32